The Battle of Cañada Strongest was a battle fought from May 10–25, 1934, between the Bolivian and Paraguayan armies during the Chaco War. The engagement is considered the greatest victory of the Bolivian army during the war. 

The battle actually took place some 60 km southwest of Cañada Strongest, near a dried riverbed called Cañada Esperanza. The battle began as a Paraguayan attempt to outflank and eventually conquer Fort Ballivian, a large stronghold that was the keystone of Bolivian defenses along the border with Argentina. 

Paraguayan forces began to open a new trail in the dry subtropical forests of the Chaco but were discovered by Bolivian aerial reconnaissance. The Paraguayan troops, unaware of having been discovered, were encircled by Bolivian forces who had sneaked up on the path and were waiting for a substantial number of Paraguayan troops to enter the pathway before they ambushed them. A 250-man Paraguayan detachment sent in to monitor the Bolivian movements was also surrounded and eventually captured on May 25 along Lóbrego Path, a route between the first Paraguayan lines and Cañada Esperanza. 

The Bolivian army took 1,500 prisoners and a good amount of weaponry, trucks and supplies, while almost 400 Paraguayan soldiers were killed. An entire Paraguayan division, however, managed to slip away, along with some scattered units.

Sources
Farcau, Bruce W. (1996): The Chaco War: Bolivia and Paraguay, 1932-1935, Greenwood Publishing Group, pp. 177–182. 
Robert L. Schein. (2003): Latin America's Wars: The age of the professional soldier, 1900-2001, p. 98.

Canada Strongest
Canada Strongest
1934 in Paraguay
1934 in Bolivia
May 1934 events
History of Boquerón Department